Sweet Honey in the Rock is an all-woman, African-American a cappella ensemble. They are an American three-time Grammy Award–nominated troupe who express their history as black women through song, dance, and sign language.  Originally a four-person ensemble, the group has expanded to five-part harmonies, with a sixth member acting as a sign-language interpreter. Although the members have changed over five decades, the group continues to sing and perform worldwide.

Musical career
Sweet Honey in the Rock was founded in 1973 by Bernice Johnson Reagon, who was teaching a vocal workshop with the Washington, D.C. Black Repertory Company. Reagon retired from the group in 2004. The name of the group was derived from a song, based on Psalm 81:16, which tells of a land so rich that when rocks were cracked open, honey flowed from them. Johnson has said that this first song in which four women blended their voices was so powerful, that there was no question what the name of the group should be. The ensemble's most powerful messages are proclaimed through an enormous catalog of songs addressing the world's woes. They are currently occupied with immigration injustices, congressional greed and lack of compassion for citizens, the environmental imbalance, racial issues and women's issues.

Sweet Honey in the Rock has received several Grammy Award nominations, including one for their children's album, Still the Same Me which received the Silver Award from the National Association of Parenting Publications. They contributed their version of Lead Belly's "Grey Goose" for from the compilation album Folkways: A Vision Shared which won the Grammy Award for Best Traditional Folk Album.

Their vocals appeared in a number of animated counting cartoons on the long-running PBS series Sesame Street, and the group was the subject of the 2005 documentary Sweet Honey in the Rock: Raise Your Voice.

The group has ventured through 20 vocalists since its creation. Embarking on a new chapter in their musical journey, Sweet Honey In The Rock now includes four core vocalists—Louise Robinson, Carol Maillard (both founding members), Nitanju Bolade Casel, and Aisha Kahlil. Shirley Childress, an American Sign Language Interpreter, performed live with the group from 1981 until her passing in 2017.

Influences
Sweet Honey in the Rock has been making music since the mid-1970s. Although the members of the group have changed over time, their music has consistently combined contemporary rhythms and narratives with a musical style rooted in the Gospel music, spirituals and hymns of the African-American Church. The ensemble composes much of their own music. They have addressed topics including motherhood, spirituality, freedom, civil rights, domestic violence, immigration issues, and racism. In their latest album, "#LoveinEvolution," they address the additional topics of police shootings, specifically the Charleston church shooting, and the environment.

Members
Over the decades, more than 20 individuals have lent their voices to Sweet Honey in the Rock. Beginning as a quartet, the group is now composed of six African-American women (including a professional American Sign Language interpreter who accompanies the group on concert tours).

Current group members
Nitanju Bolade Casel
Aisha Kahlil
Louise Robinson (an original ensemble member)
Carol Lynn Maillard (an original ensemble member)
Barbara Hunt (sign language interpreter)
Rochelle Rice
Christie Dashiell
Romeir Mendez (bassist)

Previous group members

Ysaye Maria Barnwell
Bernice Johnson Reagon (founder)
Shirley Childress Saxton (sign language interpreter) (B.1947-D.2017) 
Arnae Batson
Mie
Dianaruthe Wharton
Evelyn Maria Harris
Rosie Lee Hooks
Ayodele Harrington
Ingrid Ellis
Tia Juana Starks
Patricia Johnson
Yasmeen Williams
Laura Sharp
Tulani Jordan Kinard
Helena Coleman
Geraldine Hardin
Akua Opokuwaa
Navasha Daya (special guest for "40 and Fierce Tour")

"Are We a Nation?"
On June 22, 2010, the group released the song "Are We a Nation?", their response to Arizona's controversial immigration law, SB-1070. An official music video of the song was released online on July 2, 2010. Directed by James Lester, the video was shot in New York City at Tainted Blue Recording Studio during a live recording session of the song. Amanda Navarro researched and provided the video's archival images and Russel Soder was the cinematographer. Ramon Hervey II served as the project's executive producer. The band donated a portion of the proceeds from the sales of "Are We a Nation?" to the Center for Community Change, an organization founded in 1968 to honor the life of Robert F. Kennedy. Sweet Honey in the Rock also joined The Sound Strike, boycotting performances within Arizona in protest of the law.

Discography
 Sweet Honey in the Rock (1976)
 B'lieve I'll Run On... See What the End's Gonna Be (1978)
 Good News (1981)
 We All... Every One of Us (1983)
 The Other Side (1985)
 Feel Something Drawing Me On (1985)
 Breaths... The Best Of (1988)
 Live at Carnegie Hall (1988)
 All for Freedom (1989)
 In This Land (1992)
 Still on the Journey: The 20th Anniversary Album (1993)
 I Got Shoes (1994)
 Sacred Ground (1995)
 Selections 1976–1988 (1997)
 ...Twenty Five... (1998)
 Still the Same Me (2000)
 Freedom Song (2000)
 The Women Gather (2003)
 Alive in Australia (2003)
 Endings & Beginnings (2004)
 Raise Your Voice (2005) [soundtrack]
 Experience...101 (2007)
 Go in Grace (2008)
 "Are We a Nation?" (2010)
 A Tribute — Live! Jazz at Lincoln Center (2013)
 "Silent Night" (2014)
 #LoveInEvolution (2016)

Awards and nominations

Nominations
Grammy Awards – 2008 – Best Musical Album For Children – Experience... 101
Grammy Awards – 2000 – Best Musical Album For Children – Still the Same Me

References

External links

 
 
 
 
 

African-American musical groups
American gospel musical groups
American vocal groups
Professional a cappella groups
American folk musical groups
Political music groups
Women's music
Grammy Award winners
Musical groups established in 1973
Flying Fish Records artists
Rykodisc artists